Teenage Mutant Ninja Turtles is a 1990 American superhero film directed by Steve Barron from a screenplay by Todd W. Langen and Bobby Herbeck. It is the first film adaptation of the comic book characters created by Kevin Eastman and Peter Laird. It stars Judith Hoag and Elias Koteas with the voices of Brian Tochi, Robbie Rist, Corey Feldman, and Josh Pais. 

Teenage Mutant Ninja Turtles follows the Turtles on a quest to save their master, Splinter, with their new allies, April O'Neil and Casey Jones, from the Shredder and his Foot Clan. It adapts the early Teenage Mutant Ninja Turtles comics, with several elements taken from the animated series airing at the time. The turtle costumes were developed by Jim Henson's Creature Shop, one of Jim Henson's last projects before his death shortly after the premiere.

Teenage Mutant Ninja Turtles was released theatrically in the United States on March 30, 1990, by New Line Cinema. It received mixed reviews, but was a box-office success, grossing $202 million on a budget of $13.5 million; it was the highest-grossing independent film up to that time and the ninth highest-grossing film worldwide of 1990. It was followed by Teenage Mutant Ninja Turtles II: The Secret of the Ooze (1991) and Teenage Mutant Ninja Turtles III (1993).

Plot

In New York City, television reporter April O'Neil reports on a silent crime wave quickly enveloping the city. That night, April is attacked by a group of thieves, and is saved by an unseen group of vigilantes. April's rescuers, the Teenage Mutant Ninja Turtles—Leonardo, Donatello, Michelangelo, and Raphael—return to their hidden lair in the sewer, where their master, a rat named Splinter, advises them to continue practicing the art of ninjutsu. Raphael visits the surface and ends up in a fight with the brutal vigilante Casey Jones, who ultimately escapes. 

April continues investigating the crime wave, correctly theorizing it to be the work of the ninja Foot Clan; the Foot's leader, The Shredder, orders her to be silenced. A group of Foot attack April in the subway, although Raphael defeats them and carries the unconscious April back to the turtles' lair, unaware that one of the Foot is following him. Once April awakens, Splinter introduces himself and the turtles, explaining that they were once normal animals, before being mutated into intelligent, anthropomorphic creatures by a mysterious chemical and trained by Splinter in ninjitsu. After the turtles escort April home, they find their hideout ransacked and Splinter kidnapped. They return to April's apartment and spend the night there.

April's supervisor, Charles Pennington, visits April's apartment with his delinquent son, Danny. Danny glimpses the turtles hiding, and later runs away from home following an argument with his father. At the Foot's hideout, Shredder informs his followers of the turtles' threat, and Danny reports his findings.

Raphael argues with Leonardo over his leadership, and retreats to the roof of the apartment. The Foot arrive and beat Raphael unconscious, laying siege to the apartment. The apartment catches fire, and the turtles and April escape with help from Casey. Guilt-stricken, Danny seeks counsel from the imprisoned Splinter, and runs away from the Foot. The turtles retreat to an abandoned farm belonging to April's family, where Raphael recovers and April and Casey bond. Leonardo receives a vision of Splinter, and joins the other turtles to contact him through astral projection. Splinter delivers his final lesson, inspiring the turtles to return to the city. 

The turtles return to their lair, finding Danny hiding there. While the turtles are sleeping, Danny returns to the Foot's hideout and meets with Splinter, followed by Casey. Splinter tells Danny the story of how, when he was still an ordinary rat, he learned ninjutsu from his former master, the ninja Hamato Yoshi. Fellow ninja Oroku Saki rivalled with Yoshi over the love of a woman, Tang Shen, who fled with Yoshi to New York to avoid conflict with Saki; however, Saki pursued and killed them. Shredder discovers Danny and realizes that the turtles have returned, ordering Splinter to be killed. Casey and Danny free Splinter and defeat Shredder's lieutenant Tatsu, before convincing the remaining Foot members of Shredder's manipulations. 

The turtles battle the Foot in their lair, repelling them onto the streets. Shredder arrives and confronts the turtles on a rooftop, overpowering them. As Shredder prepares to kill Leonardo, Splinter appears, identifying Shredder as Oroku Saki; in turn, he recognizes Splinter as Yoshi's pet rat. Shredder attempts to kill Splinter, only to be thrown off the roof by Michelangelo's nunchaku, landing in a garbage truck, which Casey uses to crush him. The police arrive to arrest the remaining Foot, and Danny reunites with his father. April and Casey share a kiss, while the turtles begin to celebrate their victory with Splinter.

Cast

Live action
 Judith Hoag as April O'Neil, a reporter for Channel 3 News
 Elias Koteas as Casey Jones, a streetwise vigilante and former ice hockey player who becomes an ally of the turtles
 Jay Patterson as Charles Pennington, April's boss
 Michael Turney as Danny Pennington, Charles's teenage son
 Raymond Serra as Sterns, the Chief of New York City Police Department
 James Saito as Oroku Saki / The Shredder, the leader of a network of runaways-turned-thieves and the main antagonist of the film
 Toshishiro Obata as Master Tatsu, Shredder's second-in-command
 Sam Rockwell as Head Thug, an unmasked gang member

Skeet Ulrich and Scott Wolf appear as unnamed members of the Foot Clan, in uncredited roles.

Voice cast
 Brian Tochi as Leonardo, the leader of the Turtles and the closest to Splinter
 Josh Pais as Raphael, the rebellious and angry Turtle
 Corey Feldman as Donatello, the brains of the Turtles
 Robbie Rist as Michelangelo, the youngest Turtle, a fun-loving partier
 Kevin Clash as Splinter, the Turtles' master
 David McCharen as Oroku Saki / The Shredder
 Michael McConnohie as Master Tatsu

Puppeteers
 David Forman as Leonardo (in-suit performer)
 Martin P. Robinson as Leonardo (facial assistant)
 Leif Tilden as Donatello (in-suit performer)
 David Rudman as Donatello (facial assistant)
 Ernie Reyes Jr. as Donatello (in-suit martial arts stunt double)
 Reggie Barnes as Donatello (in-suit skateboarding double)
 Josh Pais as Raphael (in-suit performer)
 David Greenaway as Raphael (facial assistant)
 Kenn Troum as Raphael (in-suit martial arts stunt double)
 Michelan Sisti as Michaelangelo (in-suit performer)
 Mak Wilson as Michelangelo (facial assistant)
 Kevin Clash as Splinter (puppeteer)
 Rickey Boyd as Splinter (facial assistant)
 Robert Tygner as Splinter (assistant puppeteer)

All four actors who played the in-suit turtles also appeared in cameos, with David Forman (Leonardo) as a gang member, Michelan Sisti (Michaelangelo) as a pizza delivery man, Leif Tilden (Donatello) as a messenger of The Foot and Josh Pais (Raphael) as a passenger in a taxi. Pais was the only actor to portray a Turtle on screen and also provide his voice.

Production

The script is based mainly on the early Teenage Mutant Ninja Turtles comics, including the stories of the turtles' origins, rooftop battle, sojourn to the farmhouse, and battle with Shredder. Elements were taken from the 1980s animated series, such as the Turtles' colored bandanas and love of pizza, elements of Michelangelo's character, and April O'Neil as a television reporter instead of a lab assistant.

The film's budget was $13.5 million. Much of the production took place in North Carolina, with a couple of location shoots in New York City during the summer of 1989 to capture famous landmark areas, such as Times Square, the Empire State Building, and the Hudson River. Filming in North Carolina took place at the North Carolina Film Studios, where New York rooftop sets were created. Production designer Roy Forge Smith and his art director, Gary Wissner, went to New York City four months prior to filming and took still photographs of rooftops and other various locations. While in NYC, Smith and Wissner were allowed to explore an abandoned Brooklyn subway line, as they could not gain access to a city sewer, but the structure of the subway had the same principle as a sewer. They also went to a water tunnel which had large pipes running through it.

After design sketches were created, the construction team used the studios' backlot to create some of the sets. There were problems with the manholes that led to the turtles' home, in that an eight-foot square room had to be constructed beneath them, but found water at about five-feet, and thus had to pour concrete into the underground rooms to keep the water out. In order to make the sewer authentic, a tide-mark was given, and it was covered with brick, plaster and stucco paint to give the walls a realistic look.

The turtle costumes were created by Jim Henson's Creature Shop in London. Jim Henson said that the creatures were the most advanced that he had ever worked with. The creatures were first made out of fiberglass, and then remolded out of clay. They were produced as molds to cast the whole body in foam rubber latex. The work at the Creature Shop was completed within 18 weeks.

Many major studios, such as Walt Disney Pictures, Columbia Pictures, MGM/UA, Orion Pictures, Paramount (whose parent company Viacom would acquire the TMNT property in 2009), and Warner Bros. turned down the film for distribution; they were worried that despite the popularity of the cartoon and the toy line, the film could potentially be a box office disappointment, like Masters of the Universe was just a couple years prior. The film found distribution roughly halfway through the initial production, via the then small and independent production company New Line Cinema, which had been known for distributing low-budget B movies and arthouse fare.

According to Brian Henson, the film was finished in post-production largely without Barron. Editor Sally Menke, who later edited many films by Quentin Tarantino, was removed as production company Golden Harvest did not like her work.

Music

Release

Marketing
Live Entertainment Inc. announced that the film would go to VHS via its Family Home Entertainment label on October 4, 1990. The suggested price was $24.99 per cassette. Pizza Hut engaged in a $20 million marketing campaign tied into the film (despite the fact that Domino's Pizza was used as product placement in the film itself). Items included advertising in print, radio and television, and several rebate coupons.

Alternate versions
The UK version removed Eastern fighting weapons like the nunchaku, using alternate shots of Michaelangelo in order to conceal his nunchaku weapon, or omitting the show-off duel between Michaelangelo and a member of the Foot clan. Also, the scene of Shredder in the garbage shred was heavily edited and the Turtle Power song was edited to change the word 'ninja' to 'hero' as per the UK television series. The unedited version was released on DVD in 2004 in the UK.

The German theatrical voice-dubbed version is identical to the UK version, i.e. it omits the usage of the nunchaku. Furthermore, the German dubbing audio track contains several "cartoon-like" sounds in order to soften the violence of the fight scenes. Although the German dub of the film was released with unedited pictures on DVD, the German dub audio version with the cartoonish sounds were still kept, because they were permanently merged into the German voice-dubbing audio.

Home media
In 1990, the film was released to VHS and reached No. 4 in the home video market. The film was released to DVD in Region 1 on September 3, 2002; it includes only minor special features, such as a trailer and interactive menus. The film was also released in the MiniDVD format.

On August 11, 2009, the film was included in a special 25th anniversary box set (commemorating the original comic book), released to both DVD and Blu-ray formats. It also contained Teenage Mutant Ninja Turtles II: The Secret of the Ooze, Teenage Mutant Ninja Turtles III, and the animated release, TMNT (2007). No additional features, other than theatrical trailers, were included. In Germany, a "Special Edition" was released on March 12, 2010, with additional features, including an audio commentary by director Steve Barron, an alternate ending, and alternate takes from the original German release, where Michelangelo's nunchaku had been edited out. Warner Home Video released the film along with Secret of the Ooze and Teenage Mutant Ninja Turtles III as part of a "Triple Feature" on Blu-ray in June 2012, minus the fourth film TMNT. Warner Home Video released the film separately on Blu-ray on December 18. In the UK, Medium Rare released the film along with its sequels in a 3 DVD set on 28 October 2013. Bonus features included a 30-minute documentary entitled “Making of Teenage Mutant Ninja Turtles” and trailers.

Reception

Box office
The film opened in the United States on March 30, 1990, and was number one at the box office over the weekend, grossing more than $25 million, the biggest opening weekend an independent film had ever had up to that time. It went on to gross  in its opening week, making it the second biggest US opening ever up until then (after 1989's Batman).

The film turned out to be a huge success at the box office, eventually making over $135 million in North America, and over $66 million outside North America, for a worldwide total of over $200 million, making it the ninth highest-grossing film of 1990 worldwide. The film was also nominated for awards by The Academy of Science Fiction, Fantasy and Horror Films.

Critical response
On the film's initial release, Roger Ebert gave 2.5 out of 4 stars and concluded it to be "nowhere near as bad as it might have been, and probably is the best possible Teenage Mutant Ninja Turtle movie. It supplies, in other words, more or less what Turtle fans will expect". Ebert singled out the production design, which he described as a "low-rent version of Batman or Metropolis." Variety praised the film's tongue-in-cheek humor and "amusingly outlandish" martial arts sequences, but thought it was "visually rough around the edges" and "sometimes sluggish in its plotting". Janet Maslin of The New York Times criticized the cinematography, stating that it was so "poorly photographed that the red-masked turtle looks almost exactly like the orange-masked one". Kim Newman wrote in the Monthly Film Bulletin that he found the characters reminiscent of the early 1970s Godzilla film series, describing the turtles as "loveable monsters in baggy foam rubber suits" who "befriended lost children and smashed things up in orgies of destruction that somehow never hurt anyone" and "drop the occasional teenage buzzword but are never remotely convincing as teenagers, mutants, ninjas or turtles".

Variety, the New York Times, and the Monthly Film Bulletin all noted the Asian villains of the film; Variety described "overtones of racism in its use of Oriental villains", while Maslin stated "the story's villainous types are Asian, and the film plays the yellow-peril aspects of this to the hilt". Newman noted a racist joke in April O'Neil's response to the Foot Clan, "What's the matter, did I fall behind on my Sony payments?", finding that the film expressed a "resentment of Japan's economic strength even while the film is plundering Japan's popular culture". Ebert felt there was "no racism" in the film.

Lloyd Bradley of Empire Magazine gave the film four out of five stars, stating: "A well-rounded, unpretentious, very funny, knockabout adventure – subtly blended so that it's fun for all the family". Owen Gleiberman, writing for Entertainment Weekly, gave an F rating, finding that none of the four turtles or Splinter had any personality, but felt that a young audience might enjoy the film, noting he might have "gone for it too had I been raised on Nintendo games and the robotic animation that passes for entertainment on today's Saturday-morning TV". 

Entertainment Weekly and The New York Times praised the work of Jim Henson's Creature Shop, with Maslin stating "without which there would have been no film at all".

As of 2022, the film has an approval rating of 41% on Rotten Tomatoes based on reviews from 54 critics and an average rating of 5.10/10. The website's consensus states, "Teenage Mutant Ninja Turtles is exactly as advertised: one-liners, brawls, and general silliness. Good for the young at heart, irritating for everyone else". On Metacritic, it has a score of 51 based on reviews from 21 critics, indicating "mixed or average reviews".

Sequels

Following the huge success of Teenage Mutant Ninja Turtles at the box office, several films were created. A year later, Teenage Mutant Ninja Turtles II: The Secret of the Ooze was released in theaters, and was a commercial success. In 1993, Teenage Mutant Ninja Turtles III was released in theaters, to a smaller box office take.

Animated film

After a 14-year absence from theaters, a fourth film, TMNT, was released in 2007, though unlike the trilogy, this was a CGI animated film.

Notes

References

External links

 Official Warner Bros. Site
 
 
 
 
 

1990
1990 films
1990 independent films
1990 martial arts films
1990 action comedy films
1990s science fiction comedy films
1990s superhero films
American action comedy films
American films about revenge
American independent films
American martial arts comedy films
American superhero films
1990s English-language films
Golden Harvest films
Fictional portrayals of the New York City Police Department
Films about the New York City Police Department
Films about father–son relationships
Films about juvenile delinquency
Films based on American comics
Films directed by Steve Barron
Films scored by John Du Prez
Films set in New York City
Films shot in New York City
Films shot in North Carolina
Live-action films based on comics
Martial arts comedy films
Martial arts science fiction films
New Line Cinema films
Ninja films
1990s superhero comedy films
1990s teen films
Teenage Mutant Ninja Turtles (1990 film series)
1990s American films